Mariella Ourghi (1972 in Tirschenreuth- November 14, 2015) was an Islamic scholar.

Career
Since completing her doctorate in Islamic Studies at the University of Freiburg, she was a lecturer in Islamic studies. Her main research interests were Islamism (especially jihadist movements) and legitimation of violence, eschatology in modern Islam and Twelve Shiite state concepts.

Books 
 Muslimische Positionen Zur Berechtigung Von Gewalt: Einzelstimmen, Revisionen, Kontroversen (Bibliotheca Academica - Reihe Orientalistik), 2010
 Schiitischer Messianismus Und Mahdi-Glaube in Der Neuzeit (Mitteilungen Zur Sozial- Und Kulturgeschichte der Islamische), 2008

References

External links 
 Ourghi

2015 deaths
1972 births
German non-fiction writers
Academic staff of the University of Freiburg
German Islamic studies scholars